Mieli may refer to:

 Ryan Gobbe, an Australian electronic musician
 Paolo Mieli, an Italian journalist
 Mario Mieli, a leading figure in the Italian gay movement of the 1970s
 Valerio Mieli, a French-Italian director, writer, scenarist and photographer
 Félix Miélli Venerando (1937-2012), football player from Brazil